Dzmitry Zhyhunou (born 10 July 1996) is a Belarusian cyclist, who most recently rode for UCI ProTeam .

Major results

2015
 National Road Championships
1st  Under-23 road race
2nd Road race
 3rd Grand Prix of Moscow
 10th Moscow Cup
 10th Horizon Park Race Maidan
2016
 9th Grand Prix of Vinnytsia
2017
 3rd Horizon Park Race Maidan

References

External links

1996 births
Living people
Belarusian male cyclists
People from Rechytsa
Sportspeople from Gomel Region